Florida is a district of the Siquirres canton, in the Limón province of Costa Rica.

History 
Florida was created on 19 September 1911 by Ley 11.

Geography 
Florida has an area of  km² and an elevation of  metres.

Locations
 Neighborhoods (Barrios): El Alto
 Villages (Poblados): Alto Gracias a Dios, Alto Laurelar, Altos de Pascua, Bonilla Abajo, Casorla, Chonta, Destierro, Fourth Cliff, Huecos, Lomas, Llano, Pascua, Río Peje, Roca, Rubí, San Antonio, Túnel Camp

Demographics 

For the 2011 census, Florida had a population of  inhabitants.

Transportation

Road transportation 
The district is covered by the following road routes:
 National Route 415

Economy
It shares with Siquirres District the biggest hydroelectrical dam of Central America, the Proyecto Hidroeléctrico Reventazón, built over the Reventazón River by the Instituto Costarricense de Electricidad. Impressive views of the dam are a main tourist attraction in the district.

References 

Districts of Limón Province
Populated places in Limón Province